Cogia hippalus, the acacia skipper, is a species of dicot skipper in the butterfly family Hesperiidae. It is found in Central America, North America, and South America.

Subspecies
The following subspecies are recognised:
 Cogia hippalus hester Evans, 1953
 Cogia hippalus hippalus (W. H. Edwards, 1882)
 Cogia hippalus hiska Evans, 1953
 Cogia hippalus peninsularis Miller & MacNeill, 1969

References

Further reading

 

Eudaminae
Articles created by Qbugbot
Butterflies described in 1882